Pontyates is a village straddling two communities situated in the Gwendraeth Valley halfway between Carmarthen and Llanelli in Carmarthenshire, West Wales. the population in 2011 was 1,449.

General information
The village of Pontyates offers a local garage, its own fire and rescue station, two bilingual primary schools, a post office, a fish and chip shop, public houses, a hairdressers and places of worship. The village is situated on the banks of the Gwendraeth Fawr river. It sits adjacent to the B4309 that runs between the towns of Carmarthen and Llanelli which are both about 10 miles from the village. The village is primarily Welsh-speaking. Pontyates is set in a rural area which hosts impressive views of the surrounding valleys from the top of the hill. It is known to have two sides to the village, the Carmarthen side and the Llanelli side, known locally as "pentre hyn" (this village) and "pentre draw" (that village), depending on which side the speaker stands. 
The population was around 4000 in 1929 according to the parish entry of that year (Sourced from 'The Welsh Church Year Book, 1929').

Statistics
(According to National Statistics Online)
Average Age - 42
Average Commute - 12.8 (miles)
Gender Ratio - 1.06 (female/male)
Population in Good Health - 58.3%
Students - 3%

History
From 1909 to 1953 Pontyates had its own railway station run by the Burry Port and Gwendraeth Valley Railway company. Pontyates was one of the stations that lay between Llanelli and the coal mine at Cwmmawr. The fact that the line was built down the old canal route meant that it was prone to flooding. The station at Pontyates was closed in 1953. Despite it being no longer in use, the railway line still runs across the road today and can be walked across as part of the mining heritage trail.

Origin of name
According to the BBC Wales programme 'What's in a name'. 'Pontyates' is said to have been named after an English family, Yates. 'Pont' translates as 'bridge' in English and the Welsh word 'Y' means 'of'. This would mean the literal translation of Pontyates is Bridge-of-Yates. However, due to the name's similarity to the local word 'iet' meaning 'gate' the village is more commonly referred to as 'Pontiets'. A testament to this is the fact that both names appear on the welcome sign when entering the village.
Another more realistic understanding of the origin of the village's name which locals believe is that 'iet' which means gate in Welsh was used as the village is the gateway to the Gwendreath Valley/Cwm Gwendraeth from the coast.

Sport
Pontyates is home to the rugby club Pontyates R.F.C. which plays in the Welsh Rugby Union, Division Five West League.

Notable people
 Mandy Rice-Davies - famous for her role in the Profumo affair.
June Brown - famous for her role as Dot Cotton in BBC's EastEnders, was evacuated to the village during the Second World War.

References

Villages in Carmarthenshire
Llanelli Rural